Elmwood may refer to:

 James Russell Lowell (1819–1891), who used it as a nom-de-plume

Places

Canada
Elmwood, Edmonton, Edmonton, Alberta 
Elmwood (electoral district), provincial electoral district in Manitoba
Elmwood, Winnipeg, Manitoba 
Elmwood—Transcona, federal electoral district in Manitoba
Elmwood, a community in West Grey, Ontario

United States
(sorted by state, then city/town)
 Elmwood, Berkeley, California
 Elmwood, Illinois
 Elmwood Township, Peoria County, Illinois
 Elmwood (Georgetown, Kentucky), listed on the National Register of Historic Places (NRHP) in Scott County
 Elmwood (Richmond, Kentucky), listed on the NRHP in Madison County
 Elmwood (Springfield, Kentucky), listed on the NRHP in Washington County
 Elmwood, Louisiana
 Elmwood (Williamsport, Maryland), listed on the NRHP in Washington County
 Elmwood (Cambridge, Massachusetts), listed on the NRHP in Middlesex County
 Elmwood, Holyoke, Massachusetts, a neighborhood of Holyoke, Massachusetts
 Elmwood Charter Township, Michigan in Leelanau County
 Elmwood (Sault Ste. Marie, Michigan), listed on the NRHP in Chippewa County
 Elmwood Township, Michigan in Tuscola County
 Elmwood Township, Clay County, Minnesota
 Elmwood, Missouri
 Elmwood, Nebraska
 Elmwood (Lewis, North Carolina), listed on the NRHP in Granville County
 Elmwood (Merry Hill, North Carolina), listed on the NRHP in Bertie County
 Elmwood (Raleigh, North Carolina), listed on the NRHP in Wake County
 Elmwood (Windsor, North Carolina), listed on the NRHP in Bertie County
 Elmwood (Grafton, North Dakota), listed on the NRHP in Walsh County
 Elmwood (Oyster Bay, New York), an historic house listed on the NRHP in Nassau County
 Elmwood, Ohio, an unincorporated community
 Elmwood, Oklahoma
 Elmwood, Providence, Rhode Island, a neighborhood of Providence, Rhode Island
 Elmwood, Tennessee
 Elmwood, Texas, an unincorporated community in Anderson County, Texas
 Elmwood, West Virginia
 Elmwood, Wisconsin
 Elmwood (Murfreesboro, Tennessee), listed on the NRHP in Rutherford County
 Elmwood (Dallas), Texas, a neighborhood
 Elmwood (Culpeper, Virginia), listed on the NRHP in Culpeper County
 Elmwood (Loretto, Virginia), listed on the NRHP in Essex County
 Elmwood (Shepherdstown, West Virginia), a Federal style house listed on the NRHP in Jefferson County
 Elmwood-on-the-Opequon, West Virginia
 Elmwood (Union, West Virginia), an historic house listed on the NRHP in Monroe County

See also
 Elmwood Cemetery (disambiguation)
 Elmwood Park (disambiguation)
 Elmwood Place, Ohio
 Elmwood School (Ottawa), Ontario
 Elmwood Township (disambiguation)